Drymaeus liliaceus is a species of  tropical air-breathing land snail, a pulmonate gastropod mollusk in the family Bulimulidae.

References

External links 
 Breure A. S. H. (1979). "Systematics, phylogeny and zoogeography of Bulimulinae (Mollusca)". Zoologische Verhandelingen Leiden 168: 1-215, figs 1-182, pls. 1-3, tables 1-5. PDF.
 Pilsbry H. A. (1899). American Bulimulidae: North American and Antillean Drymaeus, Leiostracus, Orthalicinae and Amphibuliminae. Manual of Conchology (2)12: i-iii, 1-258, pls 1-64. page 10-11, plate 13, fig. 90, 91, 92.

Drymaeus
Gastropods described in 1821